LPK (formerly known as Libby, Perszyk, Kathman Inc.) is a brand design and innovation agency headquartered in Cincinnati, Ohio. The company is the largest employee-owned brand design agency in the world.

History 
LPK’s origins trace back to 1919, when Cliff Schaten started an art studio called C.H. Schaten Studios upon his return to Cincinnati after World War One. In 1959, seven of its employees purchased the company, renaming it Studio Art Associates. During the 1960s and 1970s, the company, which had been renamed Cato Johnson, opened offices in London, Brussels, Geneva, Paris, New York and Toronto. In 1975, Cato Johnson was acquired by advertising firm Young & Rubicam (Y&R), which continued to expand with locations in San Francisco, Hong Kong, São Paulo and Mexico City. In 1983, five Y&R employees—Mort Libby, Ray Perszyk, Jerry Kathman, Howard McIlvain and Jim Gabel—organized a leveraged buyout of the Cincinnati office and renamed the firm Libby, Perszyk, Kathman.[3]

Leadership 
From LPK’s founding in 1983 until 1997, the late Mort Libby served as Chief Executive Officer, followed by Jerry Kathman, who served as CEO from 1997 until 2016. In 2015, Executive leadership included Chief Executive Officer Jerry Kathman,[6] Chief Creative Officer Nathan Hendricks, Global Development Officer John Recker, Chief Organizational Officer Phil Best and Chief Financial Officer Dennis Geiger. 

In July 2016, the company announced the appointment of LPK’s current chief officers: Chief Executive Officer Sarah Tomes, Chief Financial Officer Brent McCoy and Chief Growth Officer (previously Chief Insight & Innovation Officer), Valerie Jacobs. They joined Chief Creative Officer, Nathan Hendricks. In 2020, Michael Wintrob joined LPK's C-Suite as Chief Strategy Officer. Jerry Kathman now serves as Founder and Chairman of the Board at LPK.

Clients 
Clients have included Bayer, Coleman, Expedia, US Bank, P&G, Kellogg’s, Mondelẽz, SUNY and others.

Awards 
Transform Awards North America 2019-Best visual identity from the FMCG sector: Silver- The Mad Optimist
Transform Awards North America 2019-Best visual identity from the financial services sector: Highly commended- Greater Cincinnati Foundation
Transform Awards North America 2019-Best brand evolution: Highly commended- The J.M. Smucker Company
Red Dot Award 2013: Coleman Adjustable Comfort Sleeping Bag[10]
Global ACE Awards 2014: Sealed Air
Pentaward 2011: Maker’s 46

References

Companies established in 1983
Companies based in Cincinnati